Dead or Alive most commonly refers to:

 Dead or Alive (band), a British pop band
 Dead or alive, a phrase on a wanted poster

Dead or Alive may also refer to:

Film and television
 Dead or Alive (1921 film), an American silent film directed by Dell Henderson
Dead or Alive (1944 film), an American film starring Tex Ritter
Dead or Alive, or A Minute to Pray, a Second to Die, a 1968 film
Dead or Alive 1918, a 2012 Finnish dramatized documentary about the Battle of Tampere in the Finnish Civil War
Lupin III: Dead or Alive, a 1996 animated film
Dead or Alive (1999 film), a Japanese yakuza action film
 Dead or Alive 2: Birds, 2000 
 Dead or Alive: Final, 2002
DOA: Dead or Alive, a 2006 film, based on the video game series 
"Dead or Alive", an episode of Hunter

Games 
Dead or Alive (franchise), a video game series
Dead or Alive (video game), 1996

Literature
Dead or Alive (novel), a 2010 book by Tom Clancy with Grant Blackwood
Dead or Alive, a posthumous novel by Hugh Conway, 1886

Music 
"Dead or Alive" (KAT-TUN song), 2015
Dead or Alive (Bill Anderson song), 1959
"Dead or Alive", by Deep Purple from the 1987 album The House of Blue Light
"Dead or Alive", by John Cale from the 1981 album Honi Soit
"Dead or Alive", by Johnny Thunders, 1978
"Dead or Alive", by Journey from the 1981 album Escape
"Dead or Alive", by Oingo Boingo from the 1983 album Good for Your Soul
"(Wanted) Dead or Alive", by The Manhattan Transfer from the 1981 album Mecca for Moderns
"D.O.A." (Dead or Alive), by Van Halen from the 1979 album Van Halen II

See also
 
 
 Dead Alive (disambiguation)
 Dead and Alive (disambiguation)
 DOA (disambiguation)
 Wanted Dead or Alive (disambiguation)
 Dead on arrival
 Dead or Alive Or, an episode of The Walking Dead